William Shone may refer to:

 William Shone (British Army officer) (1850–1938), British Army officer
 William Shone (footballer) (1857–?), Welsh international footballer

See also
 Shone (surname)